Célio da Conceição Junior (born June 30, 1986 in São Gonçalo), or simply Célio Junior, is a Brazilian central midfielder. He currently plays for NK Karlovac.

Honours
Flamengo
Copa do Brasil: 2006

Contract
 Flamengo 1 December 2005 to 31 December 2008.

References

External links
youtube

1986 births
Living people
Brazilian footballers
CR Flamengo footballers
Goytacaz Futebol Clube players
People from São Gonçalo, Rio de Janeiro
Association football midfielders
Sportspeople from Rio de Janeiro (state)